The Colombian order of precedence is a symbolic hierarchy of officials used to direct protocol. It is regulated by National Law 1444 of 4 May 2011.

Order of precedence
Below is the current cabinet headed by the President of the Republic, in its respective denomination, order and precedence.
The President of Colombia (Gustavo Petro)
The Vice President of Colombia (Francia Márquez)
The President of Senate (Roy Barreras)
The President of the Chamber of Representatives (David Racero)
The President of the Supreme Court of Justice of Colombia (Luis Antonio Hernández)
The Vice President of the Supreme Court of Justice of Colombia (Aroldo Quiroz Monsalvo)
The President of the Constitutional Court (Cristina Pardo Schlesinger)
The Vice President of the Constitutional Court (Diana Fajardo Rivera)
The Comptroller General of the Reublic (Carlos Felipe Córdoba)
Former Presidents of Colombia (by seniority of assuming office, as long as they don't have other public office)
César Gaviria (7 August 1990 - 7 August 1994)
Ernesto Samper (7 August 1994 - 7 August 1998)
Andrés Pastrana (7 August 1998 - 7 August 2002)
Álvaro Uribe (7 August 2002 - 7 August 2010)
Juan Manuel Santos (7 August 2010 - 7 August 2018)
Ivan Duque (7 August 2018 - 7 August 2022)
Former Vice Presidents of Colombia (by seniority of assuming office, as long as they don't have other public office)
Gustavo Adolfo Bell (7 August 2002 - 7 August 2010)
Francisco Santos Calderón (7 August 2002 - 7 August 2010)
Angelino Garzón (7 August 2010 - 7 August 2014)
Germán Vargas Lleras (7 August 2014 - 21 March 2017)
Oscar Naranjo (29 March 2017 - 7 August 2018)
Marta Lucía Ramírez (7 August 2018 - 7 August 2022)
Current Government Ministers (in their respective order of origin)
Minister of the Interior (Alfonso Prada)
Minister of Foreign Affairs (Álvaro Leyva)
Minister of Finance and Public Credit (José Antonio Ocampo)
Minister of Justice and Law (Néstor Osuna)
Minister of Defense (Iván Velásquez)
Minister of Agriculture and Rural Development (Cecilia López)
Minister of Health and Social Protection (Carolina Corcho)
Minister of Labour (Gloria Inés Ramírez)
Minister of Mines and Energy (Irene Vélez)
Minister of Commerce (Germán Umaña)
Minister of Education (Aurora Vergara)
Minister of Environment (Susana Muhamad)
Minister of Housing, City and Territory (Catalina Velasco)
Minister of Information Technologies and Communications (Sandra Urrutia)
Minister of Transport (Guillermo Reyes)
Minister of Culture (Patricia Ariza)
Minister of Sports (María Isabel Urrutia)
Minister of Science, Technology and Innovation (Arturo Luis Luna)
The Commanders of the Armed Forces (by creation of branch)
Commander of the Military Forces (Major general Helder Giraldo)
General Staff of the Colombian Military Forces (Vice admiral José Joaquín Amézquita)
Commander-in-chief of the National Army (General Luis Mauricio Opina)
Commander-in-chief of the National Navy (Vice admiral Francisco Cubides)
Commander-in-chief of the Air Force (General Luis Carlos Córdoba)
Commander-in-chief of the National Police (General Henry Sanabria)
Governors of Departments - when outside their own department (Relative precedence among governors, all of whom are outside their own department, is determined by each department's date of creation or alphabetically by department)
Governor of Amazonas (Jesús Galindo Cedeño)
Governor of Antioquia (Aníbal Gaviria)
Governor of Arauca (José Facundo Castillo)
Governor of Atlántico (Elsa Noguera)
Governor of Bolívar (Vicente Antonio Blel)
Governor of Boyacá (Ramiro Barragán Adame)
Governor of Caldas (Luis Carlos Velásquez)
Governor of Caquetá (Arnulfo Gasca Trujillo)
Governor of Casanare (Salomón Andrés Sanabria)
Governor of Cauca (Elías Larrahondo Carabalí)
Governor of Cesar (Luis Alberto Monsalvo Gnecco)
Governor of Chocó (Ariel Palacios)
Governor of Córdoba (Orlando Benítez)
Governor of Cundinamarca (Nicolás García)
Governor of Guainía (Juan Carlos Iral)
Governor of Guaviare (Heydeer Yovanny Palacio)
Governor of Huila (Luis Enrique Dussán)
Governor of La Guajira (Nemesio Roys Garzón)
Governor of Magdalena (Carlos Caicedo)
Governor of Meta (Juan Guillermo Zuluaga)
Governor of Nariño (Jhon Alexander Rojas)
Governort of North Santander (Silvano Serrano)
Governor of Putumayo (Buanerges Rosero)
Governor of Quindío (Roberto Jaramillo)
Governor of Risaralda (Sigifredo Salazar)
Governor of San Andrés y Providencia (Everth Julio Hawkins)
Governor of Santander (Mauricio Aguilar)
Governor of Sucre (Hector Olimpo)
Governor of Tolima (José Ricardo Orozco)
Governor of Valle del Cauca (Clara Luz Roldán)
Governor of Vaupés (Elícer Pérez)
Governor of Vichada (Álvaro Arley León)
Mayor of the Capital District (Claudia López)
The Vice Presidents of the Senate
The First Vice President (Miguel Ángel Pinto)
The Second Vice President (Honorio Henríquez)
The Vice Presidents of the Chamber
The First Vice President (Olga Lucía Velásquez)
The Second Vice President (Erika Tatiana Sánchez)
The Senators (by alphabetical order)
The Members and the Prosecutor of the Supreme Court
The Members of the Constitutional Court

References

Presidency of Colombia
Government of Colombia
Orders of precedence